Déjate Amar (Eng.: "Let Yourself Be Loved")  is the fourth major label studio album by Regional Mexican singer Jenni Rivera, released on March 19, 2001.

Track listing

References

2001 albums
Fonovisa Records albums
Jenni Rivera albums